Motu Mute is a  island in the Bora Bora Islands Group, within the Society Islands of French Polynesia. It is the located between Havae and Tooparopae.

The Island is the location of the Bora Bora Airport, with the runway starts and ends directly on the water. The airfield has a modern handling building in a local style. It is located directly on the beach of the lagoon and is connected to a pier, on which the ferry goes to Vaitape, the main town of the island.

Administration
The island is part of Bora Bora Commune. Its current population includes the family operating the Rent-a-boat office.

Tourism

Muri Muri Point Dive Spot
Also known as the 'White Valley' this ocean dive takes you down 60–120 feet in exquisite, transparent, royal-blue water. You dive above a large coral plateau that leads to a sand bank. Grey sharks, turtles, tuna, jacks, giant barracuda and dolphins regularly visit this deep water section of the coral reef.

Paharire Point
This is the northernmost point in Bora Bora, with a wonderful beach (although limited in access).

Transportation

After arriving in Fa'a'ā International Airport, an Air Tahiti inter-island flight (50 minutes) will bring you to Bora Bora Airport.

You will need to board the airline's catamaran shuttle to Vaitape, where you take a boat to Ahuna.

Gallery

References

External links